Phu Bai may refer to:

 Phu Bai Combat Base
 Phu Bai International Airport